Haplogroup D-Z27276 also known as Haplogroup D1a1 is a Y-chromosome haplogroup. It is one of two  branches of Haplogroup D1, one of the descendants of Haplogroup D. The other is D-M55 which is only found in Japan.

This group is found in about 46.6% Tibetan people. It branched off D-M55 35,000-40,000 years before present or already 53,000 years before present.

One sample of a subgroup of D-Z27276 was also found among ancient samples of the Koban culture between Russia and Georgia.

Phylogenetic tree 
By ISOGG tree（Version: 14.151）.

DE (YAP)
D (CTS3946)
D1 (M174/Page30, IMS-JST021355, Haplogroup D-M174)
D1a (CTS11577)　
D1a1 (F6251/Z27276)
D1a1a (M15)　Tibet, Altai Republic, Mainland China
D1a1a (F849)
D1a1a1 (N1)
D1a1a1a (Z27269)
D1a1a1a1 (PH4979)
D1a1a1a1a2 (F729)
D1a1a1a1a2a (F17412)
D-F17412* Tibetan (Chamdo), Taiwan
D-MF10280 Sichuan, Japan (Osaka)
D1a1a1a1a2b (Y62194)
D1a1a1a1a2b1 (F17409) Tibetan (Chamdo), Sichuan
D1a1a1a1a2b2 (Y62517)
D1a1a1a1a2b2a (F16077) Tibetan (Shigatse, Shannan, Lhasa)
D1a1a1a1a2b2b (Y69263)
D1a1a1a1a2b2b1 (Y161914) Tibetan (Chamdo), Zhejiang
D1a1a1a1a2b2b2 (Y61759) Uzbekistan
D1a1a1a2 (Z31591) Tibetan (Shigatse, Lhasa)
D1a1a2 (F1070) Guangdong, Xishuangbanna (Dai)
D1a1b (P99)　Tibet, Mongol, Central Asia, Altai Republic, Mainland China
D1a2 (Z3660)
D1a2a (M64.1/Page44.1, M55) 　 Japan（Yamato people、Ryukyuan people、Ainu people）
D1a2b (Y34637)　Andaman Islands（Onge people, Jarawa people）
D1b (L1378) 　 Philippines
D2 (A5580.2) 　Nigeria, Saudi Arabia, Syria

References

D-M27276